Maurodactylus is a genus of plant bug of the tribe Phylini.

References

Phylini